is a mountain or mountains in Himeji, Hyōgo, Japan. This mountain is one of the San-hiko-san, three Hiko Shugendō mountains in Japan, and also one of Hyōgo 50 mountains, and Kinki 100 mountains. It forms part of Seppiko-Mineyama Prefectural Natural Park.

Outline 
There are contradicting definitions of Mount Seppiko. Yumesaki, which was merged into Himeji City in 2005, officially define Mount Seppiko as the name of a group mountains of Mount Horagatake (884m), Mount Hokotate (950m), and Mount Mitsuji (915m). However, maps of the Geographical Survey Institute of Japan show the peak of Mount Mitsuji as the peak of Mount Seppiko. Many mountain guide books write that Mount Otenjo, one of the peaks of rocky Mount Horagatake, is the default peak of the Seppiko. Other people define the Seppiko as a name of another group of mountains consisting of Mount Horagatake, Mount Hokotate, Mount Mitsuji, and Mount Myojin, Mount Nagusa.

Religion and history 

Mount Seppiko is a place for the ascetic practices of Shugendō in this region. According to the official history of the Kaya Jinja, a Shinto shrine in the middle of the mountain, the shrine was established in the 7th century in the time of Empress Suiko. Mount Seppiko also is considered to be developed for Shugensha, practitioners of Shugendō. Kaya Jinja was originally a typical example of Shinbutsu shūgō, literally "fusion of practices from both Shinto and Buddhism", and had a Buddhist temple, Seppiko-san Kongo Chingo-ji, just beside the Shinto shrine. However, the temple was abolished by the Shinbutsu Bunri Order, literally Shinto-Buddhism-separation Order of the Meiji Government in 1868.

Mount Seppiko is one of the mountains which still have some areas which women are prohibited from entering, in order not to disturb the training of Shugensha.

Tourism 
Mount Seppiko is also very famous for rock climbing. It attracts many climbers in Kansai area.

Access 
 Seppiko-san Bus Stop of Shinki Bus

Gallery

References
 Mount Seppiko
 Yumemae-Sanzan
 the Geographical Survey Institute in Japan
 ‘Shinban Furusato Hyogo 50 San’, Hyōgoken Sangaku Renmei

Himeji, Hyōgo
Mountains of Hyōgo Prefecture
Volcanic plugs of Asia